7 vies is the eighth studio album by Australian singer and songwriter Tina Arena, released on 28 January 2008 on Columbia Records in France. The title translates into English as "7 Lives" and the first single from the album "Entends-tu le monde?" was released digitally on 15 November 2007 and physically on 11 February 2008.
This Arena's second French language album.

Track 12 is a duet between Arena and Jean-François Bernardini from Corsican folk music group I Muvrini and track 7, "Ta Vie", is a French-language version of "Until" which appeared on her previous English album Songs of Love & Loss.

7 vies is Arena's second album to be recorded entirely in French and debuted on the French Album Chart at No. 12, her highest debut on the chart to date.

On 14 February 2008, the second single was confirmed to be "L'un pour l'autre".

Track listing

Charts

Weekly charts

Year-end charts

Release history

Notes

2008 albums
Tina Arena albums
French-language albums
Columbia Records albums